Sanjay Pandey (born 12 March 1972) is an Indian actor mainly active in Bhojpuri films. He is famous for his negative roles in films. He has worked as main villain in several Bhojpuri films.

Career
Sanjay Pandey started his career as a theater artist from Bhopal theatre.

In 2002, he made his in film acting debut as a villain in the Bhojpuri film 'Kahiya Doli Laike Aiba' directed by Rajkumar R. Pandey and his performance was highly praised by critics and audience. But after three films he stopped working in Bhojpuri and is busy in television. In 2009, Rajkumar R. Pandey approached him for a film named "Deewana" with Dinesh Lal Yadav and film was biggest hit on Bhojpuri box office.

He has worked in many blockbuster film such as Saat Saheliyan, Nirahua Hindustani, Bam Bam Bol Raha Hai Kashi, Mehandi Laga Ke Rakhna, Mai Sehra Bandh Ke Aaunga, Border and Nirahua Hindustani 3.

Filmography

References

External links

1972 births
Living people
Male actors in Bhojpuri cinema
Male actors from Bihar
Indian male film actors